Socket 478, also known as mPGA478 or mPGA478B, is a 478-contact CPU socket used for Intel's Pentium 4 and Celeron series CPUs. 

Socket 478 was launched in August 2001 in advance of the Northwood core to compete with AMD's 462-pin Socket A and their Athlon XP processors.  Socket 478 was intended to be the replacement for Socket 423, a Willamette-based processor socket which was on the market for only a short time.  Socket 478 was phased out with the launch of LGA 775 in 2004.

Technical specifications
Socket 478 was used for all Northwood Pentium 4 and Celeron processors. It supported the first Prescott Pentium 4 processors and all Willamette Celerons, along with several of the Willamette-series Pentium 4s. Socket 478 also supported the newer Prescott-based Celeron D processors, and early Pentium 4 Extreme Edition processors with 2 MB of L3 CPU cache. 

Celeron D processors were also available for Socket 478 and were the last CPUs made for the socket.

While the Intel mobile CPUs are available in 478-pin packages, they in fact only operate in a range of slightly differing sockets, Socket 479, Socket M, and Socket P, each incompatible with the other two.

Socket 478 is used in combination with DDR SDRAM, as well as SDR SDRAM, RDRAM and DDR2 SDRAM.

Heatsink 
The 4 holes for fastening the heatsink to the motherboard are placed in a rectangle with lateral lengths of 60 mm and 75 mm.

Mechanical load limits
All sockets (Pentium 4 and Celeron) have the following mechanical maximum load limits which should not be exceeded during heatsink assembly, shipping conditions, or standard use. Load above those limits may crack the processor die and make it unusable.

Chipsets

Intel 
See List of Intel chipsets#Pentium 4 chipsets

See also
 List of Intel microprocessors

References

External links

Intel CPU sockets